The Sulawesi giant rat (Paruromys dominator) is a species of rodent in the family Muridae. It is monotypic in the genus Paruromys.  The species is endemic to Sulawesi in Indonesia, where it inhabits forests at elevations from sea level to the tree line. It is frugivorous and semiarboreal. While not currently listed as threatened, it is impacted by both habitat destruction and subsistence hunting.

References 

Rats of Asia
Endemic fauna of Indonesia
Rodents of Sulawesi
Taxa named by Oldfield Thomas
Mammals described in 1921
Taxonomy articles created by Polbot